James David Harrison (born July 9, 1947) is a Canadian former professional ice hockey player who played 324 games in the National Hockey League and 232 games in the World Hockey Association.  He played for the Boston Bruins, Toronto Maple Leafs, Alberta/Edmonton Oilers, Cleveland Crusaders, and Chicago Black Hawks.

Harrison was the Oilers' team-scoring champion in their inaugural (1972–73) season. That season he also set an Oilers' record by scoring 10 points (3G and 7A) in an 11-3 win over the New York Raiders in January 1973 . Before starting his professional career, Harrison set a record in junior hockey for the WHL of fastest natural hat trick, having scored 3 goals in 24 seconds for the Estevan Bruins during a 6-5 win over the Regina Pats in December 1966.

Career statistics

Regular season and playoffs

International

Awards
 CMJHL Second All-Star Team – 1967
 WCJHL Second All-Star Team – 1968

References

External links

1947 births
Living people
Boston Bruins players
Canadian ice hockey centres
Chicago Blackhawks players
Cleveland Crusaders players
Edmonton Oil Kings (WCHL) players
Edmonton Oilers (WHA) players
Edmonton Oilers players
Estevan Bruins players
Ice hockey people from Alberta
Moose Jaw Warriors coaches
New Brunswick Hawks players
Oklahoma City Blazers (1965–1977) players
People from the Municipal District of Bonnyville No. 87
Toronto Maple Leafs players
Canadian expatriate ice hockey players in the United States
Canadian ice hockey coaches